Feltus may refer to:

People with the surname 
 Barbara Feltus, later Barbara Becker (born 1966), German-American designer, actress and model
 Brig Feltus, musician who co-founded Captive Libertine Recordings with Chico Bennett
 Catherine Jewel Feltus, later Catherine Craig (1915–2004), American actress
 Gerald Feltus, a former detective in the Tamam Shud case, Australia
 J. H. Feltus, the first librarian of the General Theological Seminary, New York
 Judy Feltus, engineer on Empire Burlesque
 Martha Feltus, American politician from Vermont
 Pamela Feltus, author of books on the Condor Legion and Flying Tigers
 Peter Feltus (1942-2012), American philatelist.

People with the given name 
 Feltus Taylor (1962–2000), American executed criminal

See also
 Feltus Mound Site